Waygara Railway Station was opened on Monday 10 April 1916 as part of the Orbost railway line. The station has long since closed, with the last train passing the site in 1987.

Little evidence remains of the former station site, however the site remains as part of the East Gippsland Rail Trail, which follows the route of the former rail line.

References

External links
Waygara Vicsig

Disused railway stations in Victoria (Australia)
Transport in Gippsland (region)
Shire of East Gippsland